Yasir Afridi (born 27 July 1988) is a Pakistani footballer who plays for Khan Research Laboratories and Pakistan national football team as a midfielder. He competed at the 2010 Asian Games on the Pakistan national football team.

Khan has been with Khan Research Laboratories then they won three Pakistan Premier League titles and four National Football Challenge Cup.

Personal life
Afridi was born on 27 July 1988 in Landi Kotal, Khyber Pakhtunkhwa. Afridi is a cousin of Shaheen Afridi and Riaz Afridi, both of whom have played cricket for Pakistan national cricket team.

Career

Club career
Afridi has played his entire career at Khan Research Laboratories, coming into the first team in 2010–11 season. The club have won seven titles. During the 2018–19 season, Afridi was part for the 2018 National Challenge Cup, although he was an unused substitute in the only match he was selected and was not included in the 2018–19 Pakistan Premier League squad, which was won by Khan Research Laboratories.

International
Afridi made his international debut with Pakistan national under-23 football team in 2010 Asian Games. On 7 November 2010, Afridi made his debut against Thailand U23. Afridi was booked against Oman U23 on 63rd minute.

Career statistics

Club

Honours
Pakistan Premier League: 2011–12, 2012–13, 2013–14
National Football Challenge Cup: 2011, 2012, 2015, 2016

References

External links 
 

1988 births
Living people
Afridi people
Pashtun people
Pakistani footballers
Pakistan international footballers
Association football midfielders
Footballers at the 2010 Asian Games
Asian Games competitors for Pakistan
Khan Research Laboratories F.C. players